Leila Luik (born 14 October 1985) is an Estonian long-distance runner. She completed the Shanghai marathon with her personal best 2:37:11 in 2013. She qualified to the Rio Olympics 2016 running the Hamburg marathon in 2:42:11.

She is one of identical triplets, sister of Liina and Lily. All three qualified to participate in the marathon event representing Estonia at the 2016 Summer Olympics in Rio de Janeiro. The triplets were professional dancers before Liina brought them to running.

References

1985 births
Living people
Estonian female long-distance runners
Estonian female marathon runners
Triplets
Athletes (track and field) at the 2016 Summer Olympics
Olympic athletes of Estonia